Margaret Stanley-Wrench (1916 – 10 January 1974) was an English poet and novelist.

Life
Stanley-Wrench was the daughter of William Stanley-Wrench (1879-1951) and his wife, the novelist and cookery writer Mollie Stanley-Wrench (Violet Louisa Stanley-Wrench, née Gibbs; 1880-1966), who also wrote as "Mrs Stanley Wrench". She attended Channing School in Highgate. As an undergraduate at Somerville College, Oxford, she was the winner of the Newdigate Prize in 1937, becoming only the fifth female winner. Her poems had already appeared in Oxford Poetry and would later appear in Time and Tide and in Augury: an Oxford Miscellany (1940). Her first poetry collection was published in 1938.

At Oxford, Stanley-Wrench met the poet Keith Douglas, who became a friend. She continued to write poetry, but after the war became better known as a children's writer. Her work was included in New Poems 1965, edited by Clifford Dyment.

A collection of Stanley-Wrench's papers, including manuscripts and correspondence, is held by the Lockwood Library of the University at Buffalo.

Publications

Novels
The Rival Riding Schools (1952)
How Much For A Pony? (1955)
The Conscience of a King: The story of Thomas More (1962)
The Silver King: Edward the Confessor, the Last Great Anglo-Saxon Ruler (1966)
Chaucer, Teller of Tales (1967)

Poetry
News Reel and Other Poems (1938)
A Tale for the Fall of the Year, and other poems (1959)

Drama
The Splendid Burden (1954)
Harlequin's Revenge (1955)

References

1916 births
1974 deaths
20th-century English novelists
English women novelists
English women poets
Alumni of Somerville College, Oxford
20th-century English women
20th-century English people